Develi can refer to:

 Develi
 Develi, Düzce
 Develi, Ergani
 Develi Chamber of Commerce
 Develi railway station